The following is a list of Michigan State Historic Sites in Manistee County, Michigan. Sites marked with a dagger (†) are also listed on the National Register of Historic Places in Manistee County, Michigan.


Current listings

See also
 National Register of Historic Places listings in Manistee County, Michigan

Sources
 Historic Sites Online – Manistee County. Michigan State Housing Developmental Authority. Accessed May 17, 2011.

References

Manistee County
State Historic Sites
Tourist attractions in Manistee County, Michigan